Chlorochytriaceae is a family of algae within the order Chlamydomonadales.

References

Chlamydomonadales
Chlorophyceae families